Esteghlal Novin Mahshahr Futsal Club is an Iranian futsal club based in Mahshahr.

Establishment 
The club was originally known as Homan Saz Khozestan jonob, since the 2010 season. In the half season of 2012–13 Iran Futsal's 1st Division it was renamed Petroshimi Maron due to change of sponsorship. This season placed 8th in table and Relegatian to the 2nd Division. In 2013 they bought the right to play in Super League from Gaz Khozestan and renamed to Amaliyat Qeyr Sanati. This season placed 14th in table and Relegatian to the 1st Division. In the 2014–15 Iran Futsal's 1st Division it was renamed Esteghlal Novin Mahshahr due to change of sponsorship.

Current squad 2012

Season-by-season 
The table below chronicles the achievements of the Club in various competitions.

Honours 
National:
 Iranian Futsal 2nd Division
 Champions (1): 2010

References

External links 
 

Futsal clubs in Iran
Sport in Khuzestan Province
2010 establishments in Iran
Futsal clubs established in 2010